IC 444 is a small, 32 square arcminute reflection nebula in the constellation Gemini.

References
 nedwww.ipac.caltech.edu/
 Simbad

IC 0444
IC 0444
0444